The SkyHook JHL-40 was a proposed hybrid airship/helicopter. On July 9, 2008, Boeing announced that it had teamed up with SkyHook International, a Canadian company, to develop this aircraft.  No further press releases appear after 2009 and Skyhook International has abandoned its domain name registration since 2010 as shown by the Internet Archive.

According to company spokespeople, the aircraft would combine the best features of a blimp and a helicopter, and would be capable of carrying a 40 ton load up to  without refueling. The craft would use helium to provide enough lift to carry its own weight, and would use four helicopter rotors to lift the load and to propel the aircraft. By using both helium and helicopter rotors, the aircraft can avoid having to jettison helium after unloading.

In comparison, the CH-47 Chinook helicopter can carry a load the same distance, but can only lift a maximum of 10 tons.

SkyHook claimed that the aircraft will provide environmental benefits over traditional methods of delivering heavy loads, as it would require less fuel than a helicopter and will not require building big roads for construction equipment.

The JHL-40, or Jess Heavy Lifter, is named after Pete Jess, the President and Chief operating officer of SkyHook International, the company that owns the patent for the aircraft.

The planned aircraft has yet to be certified by Transport Canada and the U.S. Federal Aviation Administration. Currently the aircraft's overall performance and layout have been established. The next major program milestone, never reached, was to be Detailed Design in 2011, which would have centered on the design, analysis and specification of all hardware, software and related aircraft and ground support systems interfaces. Boeing planned to design and fabricate a production SkyHook HLV prototype at its Rotorcraft Systems facility in Ridley Park, Pennsylvania. The new aircraft will enter commercial service after it is certified by Transport Canada and the U.S. Federal Aviation Administration. The first SkyHook HLV aircraft was scheduled to fly in 2014. On September 13, 2010 however, Financial Times Deutschland revealed that development was halted until an infusion of 100 million dollar in public funding would be available.

See also

References

External links
 Boeing news release

Airships
Quadrotors
Boeing aircraft
International proposed aircraft